Shettihalli Timmegowda Somashekhar is an Indian politician who is the current Minister of state for Co-Operation of Karnataka from 6 February 2020. He was elected to the Karnataka Legislative Assembly from Yeshvanthapura in the 2018 Karnataka Legislative Assembly election as a member of the Indian National Congress. He later switched to the Bharatiya Janata Party and won the by-election in 2019.

References

1959 births
Living people
Bharatiya Janata Party politicians from Karnataka
Indian National Congress politicians from Karnataka
People from Bangalore
Karnataka MLAs 2018–2023